David John Weatherley (born 1 March 1939) is a British-born New Zealand actor and voice artist known for his role as Barliman Butterbur in The Lord of the Rings: The Fellowship of the Ring.

Weatherley was born in London and moved to Canada in 1956 for a military career, serving five years in the Canadian Army. He eventually moved to New Zealand in the early 60s to engage in a theatre acting career, where he is best known for his long association with the Mercury Theatre, Auckland. He has worked in all major genres including radio drama, theatre, television and film. He is perhaps best known outside New Zealand for his series regular role as Spencer in Power Rangers Operation Overdrive.

In 2016 he was presented with a Scroll of Honour from the Variety Artists Club of New Zealand for his services to the entertainment industry.

Filmography

References

External links 

1939 births
English male film actors
English male television actors
English male voice actors
Living people
Male actors from London
New Zealand male film actors
New Zealand people of English descent